United States v. Kirschner, 823 F. Supp. 2d 665 (E.D. Mich. 2010), was a federal criminal case in Michigan. The defendant had previously been indicted by a grand jury under three counts of receipt of child pornography under 18 U.S.C. § 2252A(a)(2)(A). The government sought to use a grand jury subpoena post-indictment to acquire additional evidence: the contents of an encrypted file from the defendant's hard drive.

Decision of the United States District Court

On March 30, 2010, Judge Paul D. Borman held that compelling Kirschner to divulge the password to the encrypted file would require "producing specific testimony asserting a fact" in violation of his Fifth Amendment right against self-incrimination.

See also

 In re
 Key disclosure law
 United States v. Hubbell,  
 In re Boucher
 United States v. Fricosu

References

External links

Legal history of Michigan